The following is an alphabetical list of articles related to the United Kingdom.

0-9 
 .uk – Internet country code top-level domain for the United Kingdom
 10 Downing Street
 11 Downing Street

A 

 Aberdeen
 Aberdeenshire
 Abortion in the United Kingdom
 Acts of Union 1707
 Administrative geography of the United Kingdom
 Alternative names for the British
 Americans in the United Kingdom
 Anglosphere
 Anti-British sentiment
 Architecture of the United Kingdom
 Atlantic Ocean
Atlas of the United Kingdom
 Attorney General's Office
 Australians in the United Kingdom

B 
 BAFTA
 Bank of England
 Bank of Scotland
 Berkshire
 Bermuda
 Black British
 Brexit
 Briar Hill
 Bristol
 Bristol Channel
 British:
 British (disambiguation)
 Britishness
 British Academy of Film and Television Arts
 British Airways
 British America
 British American
 British Arabs
 British Armed Forces
 British Army
 British Asian
 British astronauts
 British Broadcasting Corporation (BBC)
 British Cartographic Society
 British Chinese
 British Commonwealth
 British crown dependencies
 British cuisine
 British Empire
 British English
Comparison of British and American English
 British House of Commons
 British Indian
 British Islands
 British Isles
 British Library
 British literature
 British monarch
 British Museum
 British overseas territories
 British people
 British Petroleum
 British Rail
 British railway rolling stock
 British Raj
 British Romance
 British studies
 Buckingham Palace
 Buckinghamshire
Burnt Island

C 
 Cabinet Office
 Cabinet of the United Kingdom
 Cardiff
 Carmarthenshire
 Caernarfonshire
 Chancellor of the Exchequer
 Channel Islands
 Channel Tunnel
 Cheshire
 City status in the United Kingdom
 Clackmannanshire
 Coat of arms of United Kingdom
 Commonwealth of Nations
 Commonwealth realm
 Communications in the United Kingdom
 Cornish language
 Cornish people
 Cornwall
 County Antrim
 County Armagh
 County Down
 County Durham
 County Fermanagh
 County Londonderry
 County Tyrone
 Crown Dependencies
 Culture of the United Kingdom
 Cumbria
 Currency of the United Kingdom

D 
 Dallington Heath
Denbighshire
 Department for Business, Innovation and Skills
 Department for Communities and Local Government
 Department for Culture, Media and Sport
 Department for Education
 Department for Environment, Food and Rural Affairs
 Department for International Development
 Department for Transport
 Department for Work and Pensions
 Deputy prime minister of the United Kingdom
 Derbyshire
Devon
Dorset
 Downing Street
 Driver and Vehicle Licensing Agency
 Dumfries and Galloway
 Dundee

E 
 East Anglia
 East Ayrshire
 East Dunbartonshire
 East Midlands
 East Renfrewshire
 East Riding of Yorkshire
 East of England
 Economic geography of the United Kingdom
 Economy of the European Union
 Economy of the United Kingdom
 England
 English Channel
 English civil war
 English language
 English people
 Extreme points of the United Kingdom

F 

 Falkirk
 First Lord of the Treasury
 Flag of the United Kingdom
 Flag of England
 Flag of Northern Ireland
 Flag of Scotland
 Flag of Wales
Flintshire
Football in England
Foreign relations of the United Kingdom
History of the foreign relations of the United Kingdom
 Foreign Secretary
 Formation of the United Kingdom
Free trade agreements of the United Kingdom

G 
 Geography of the United Kingdom
 Geography of England
 Geography of Northern Ireland
 Geography of Scotland
 Geography of Wales
 Glasgow
 Gloucestershire
 Government of the United Kingdom
 Government Communications Headquarters (GCHQ)
 Great Britain
 Great Seal of the Realm
 Greater London
 Greater Manchester
 Guernsey

H 
 Hampshire
 Health in the United Kingdom
 Her Majesty's Government
 Herefordshire
 Hertfordshire
 Highland
 History of the United Kingdom
 Home Secretary
 House of Commons
 House of Lords
 Houses of Parliament

I 
 Immigration to the United Kingdom since 1922
 Industrial Revolution
Internal Market Bill 
 International Organization for Standardization
 Ireland
 Irish Sea
 Islam in the United Kingdom
 Islands of the United Kingdom
 Isle of Anglesey
 Isle of Harris
 Isle of Lewis
 Isle of Man
 Isle of Sheppey
 Isle of Wight
 Isles of Scilly

J 
 Japanese community in the United Kingdom
 Jersey

K 
 Kensington Palace
 Kent
 Koreans in the United Kingdom

L 
 Lancashire
 Languages in the United Kingdom
 Leicestershire
 Lincolnshire
 Lists related to the United Kingdom
List of airlines of the United Kingdom
List of airports in the United Kingdom and the British Crown Dependencies
 List of British cheeses
 List of British film studios
 List of British monarchs
 List of British ordnance terms
 List of British politicians who have acknowledged cannabis use
 List of British pornographic actors
 List of British stadiums by capacity
 List of canals of the United Kingdom
 List of ceremonial counties of England
 List of cities in the United Kingdom
 Aberdeen
 Armagh
 Bangor
 Bath
 Belfast
 Birmingham
 Bradford
 Brighton and Hove
 Bristol
 Cambridge
 Canterbury
 Cardiff
 Carlisle
 Chelmsford
 Chester
 Chichester
 Coventry
 Derby
 Derry
 Dundee
 Durham
 Edinburgh
 Ely
 Exeter
 Glasgow
 Gloucester
 Hereford
 Inverness
 Kingston-upon-Hull
 Lancaster
 Leeds
 Leicester
 Lichfield
 Lincoln
 Lisburn
 Liverpool
 London
 Manchester
 Newcastle upon Tyne
 Newport
 Newry
 Norwich
 Nottingham
 Oxford
 Perth
 Peterborough
 Plymouth
 Portsmouth
 Preston
 Ripon
 Salford
 Salisbury
 Sheffield
 Southampton
 St Albans
 St Asaph
 St Davids
 Stirling
 Stoke-on-Trent
 Sunderland
 Swansea
 Wakefield
 Wells
 Westminster
 Winchester
 Wolverhampton
 Worcester
 York
 List of companies of the United Kingdom
 List of companies operating trains in the United Kingdom
 List of defunct airlines of the United Kingdom
 List of English districts by area
 List of English districts by population
 List of flags of the United Kingdom
 List of football clubs in England
 List of former United Kingdom Parliament constituencies
 List of hospitals in the United Kingdom
 List of islands of the United Kingdom
 List of lakes and lochs in the United Kingdom
 List of largest private companies in the United Kingdom
 List of longest rivers of the United Kingdom
 List of metropolitan areas in the United Kingdom
 List of mountains and hills of the United Kingdom
List of places in England
List of preserved counties of Wales
List of rail accidents in the United Kingdom
List of railway lines in Great Britain
List of schools in the United Kingdom
List of Scottish council areas by population
List of shopping centres in the United Kingdom by size
List of supermarket chains in the United Kingdom
List of television channels in the United Kingdom
Lists of tourist attractions in England
List of twin towns and sister cities in the United Kingdom
List of United Kingdom general elections
List of United Kingdom locations
List of United Kingdom MPs
List of United Kingdom Parliament constituencies
List of universities in the United Kingdom
List of urban areas in the United Kingdom
 London – the capital of the United Kingdom
 Lord President of the Council
 Lord Privy Seal

M 
 Media in the United Kingdom
Merionethshire
 Merseyside
 Merthyr Tydfil County Borough
 MI5
 MI6
 Midlands Enlightenment
 Military of the United Kingdom
 Minister of the Crown
 Ministry of Defence
 Mixed British
 Monarchy of the United Kingdom
 Monmouthshire

N 
 National Health Service
 National Rail
 Naval Service
 Newport
 Norfolk
 Northern Ireland
 Northern Ireland Assembly
 Northern Irish people
 Northamptonshire
 Northumberland
 North Atlantic Ocean
 North Atlantic Treaty Organization (NATO)
 North Ayrshire
 North East England
 North Lanarkshire
 North Sea
 North West England
 North Yorkshire

O 
 Office for National Statistics
 Ordnance Survey
 Orkney
 Outline of the United Kingdom
 Oxfordshire

P 
 Palace of Westminster
 Parliament of the United Kingdom
Pembrokeshire
 People of the United Kingdom
 Perth and Kinross
 Politics in the United Kingdom
 Population of the United Kingdom
 Pound sterling
 Poverty in the United Kingdom
 Prime minister of the United Kingdom

Q 
 Queen of the United Kingdom

R 

 Renfrewshire
 Rhondda Cynon Taf
 Royal Air Force
 Royal coat of arms of the United Kingdom
 Royal Fleet Auxiliary
 Royal Marines
 Royal Navy
 Rutland

S 
 Saint Helena, Ascension and Tristan da Cunha
 Scotland
 Scottish Borders
 Scottish people
 Scottish Gaelic
 Scots language
 Secret Intelligence Service
 Secretary of State for Business, Innovation and Skills
 Secretary of State for Defence
 Secretary of State for Education
 Secretary of State for Foreign and Commonwealth Affairs
 Secretary of State for Northern Ireland
 Secretary of State for Scotland
 Secretary of State for the Home Department
 Secretary of State for Transport
 Secretary of State for Work and Pensions
 Senedd or the Welsh Assembly
 Shetland
 Shropshire
 Somerset
 South Ayrshire
 South East England
 South Lanarkshire
 South West England
 South Yorkshire
 Sport in the United Kingdom
 Staffordshire

T 
Television in the United Kingdom
Time in the United Kingdom
 Transport in the United Kingdom
 Treaty of Union
 Tyne and Wear

U 
 UK railway stations
 Ulster Scots dialect
 Ulster Scots people
 Union of the Crowns
 Union Jack
 United Kingdom:
 Countries of the United Kingdom:
 
  Northern Ireland
 
 
 Counties of the United Kingdom:
 Aberdeen
 
 
 Argyll and Bute
 
 
 Blaenau Gwent
 Bridgend
 Bristol
 
 
 Cardiff
 Carmarthenshire
 
 
 
 County Antrim
 County Armagh
 
 
 County Fermanagh
 County Londonderry
 County Tyrone
 
 Denbighshire
 
 
 
 Dumfries and Galloway
 Dundee
 East Dunbartonshire
 East Lothian
 East Renfrewshire
 
 
 Edinburgh
 
 Falkirk
 
 Glasgow
 
 
 
 Gwynedd
 
 
 
 Highland
 Inverclyde
 Isle of Anglesey
 
 
 
 
 
 
 Merthyr Tydfil
 Midlothian
 
 Moray
 Na h-Eileanan Siar
 Neath Port Talbot
 Newport
 
 
 
 North Ayrshire
 North Lanarkshire
 
 
 
 
 
 Perth and Kinross
 Powys
 Rhondda Cynon Taf
 
 Scottish Borders
 
 
 South Ayrshire
 South Lanarkshire
 
 
 Stirling
 
 Swansea
 
 
 Vale of Glamorgan
 
 West Dunbartonshire
 West Lothian
 West Midlands
 
 West Yorkshire
 
 
 Wrexham
 Crown dependencies of the United Kingdom:
 
 
 
 Overseas territories of the United Kingdom:
 
 
 
 
 
 
 
 
 
 
 
 
 
 
 Membership of the European Union
 United Nations (UN)
 Universal basic income in the United Kingdom

V 
 Vale of Glamorgan
 Vehicle registration plates of the United Kingdom
 Vietnamese people in the United Kingdom
 Visa policy of the United Kingdom
 Visa requirements for British citizens

W 
 Wales
 Warwickshire
 Westminster
 Welsh language
 Welsh people
 West Dunbartonshire
 West Lothian
 West Midlands (county)
 West Midlands (region)
 West Yorkshire
 Worcestershire
 Wrexham

X

Y 
 Yorkshire
 Yorkshire and the Humber

Z

See also
Topic overview:
United Kingdom
Outline of the United Kingdom

 
 
United Kingdom